The Glory Days Tour was the second worldwide tour and fourth overall by British girl group Little Mix. The tour began on May 21, 2017 in Birkenhead, England, and ended on March 25, 2018 in Kobe, Japan, where the group headlined POPSPRING, in support of their fourth studio album, Glory Days. The tour sold over 810,000 tickets worldwide and consisted of over 70 shows being performed across Oceania, Europe, and Asia.

The Glory Days Tour was met with critical acclaim and grossed over $42 million worldwide, becoming the highest grossing girl group tour of the decade at that time. In 2017, it was ranked as the sixth highest grossing female tour of that year. It remains as the group's highest grossing tour throughout their career, and one of the highest grossing girl group tours.

Background

On 9 September 2016, Little Mix stated in an interview that they knew when their next tour would be, but fans would have to wait for further details.

On 14 October 2016, Little Mix released the dates for the UK & Ireland leg of the tour, beginning on 27 October 2017 in Sheffield, England. Ticket pre-sales were made available to fans who pre-ordered their new album and began on 19 October 2016 with general sale beginning on 21 October 2016. Due to instant sell outs, extra dates were added in Newcastle, Belfast, Glasgow, Nottingham, Birmingham, and London. After overwhelming demand, the UK & Ireland leg was extended, and began on 9 October 2017 in Aberdeen, Scotland. European tour dates were announced on 21 November 2016, for May and June 2017, while dates in Oceania were added for July 2017 on 4 December 2016.

The Vamps supported the European leg of the tour. Ella Eyre, Sheppard, Louisa Johnson all supported selected dates on the Summer Shout Out shows. Zoe Badwi, Jade Thirlwall's cousin, was the opening act for the shows in Australia and New Zealand. Lina Makhul, Jessarae, and Aleem all supported selected dates on the UK & Ireland leg of the tour, while Lloyd Macey supported at the Manchester Arena show on 21 November 2017 after winning a prize fight on The X Factor.

In November 2017, Little Mix were announced as the headline act for  "POPSPRING 2018" in March 2018.

Set list 

{{hidden
| headercss = background: #ccccff; font-size: 100%; width: 90%;
| contentcss = text-align: left; font-size: 100%; width: 90%;
| header = Europe & Oceania Leg
| content =
"Power"
"Black Magic"
"Salute"
"Down & Dirty"
"F.U."
"Hair"
"Your Love"
"Secret Love Song, Pt II"
"No More Sad Songs"
"You Gotta Not"
"Wings"
"Touch"
"Nobody Like You"
"Shout Out to My Ex"
}}

{{hidden
| headercss = background: #ccccff; font-size: 100%; width: 90%;
| contentcss = text-align: left; font-size: 100%; width: 90%;
| header = UK & Ireland Leg
| content =
"Power
"Black Magic"
"Private Show"
"Move"
"F.U."
"No More Sad Songs"
"Your Love"
"Secret Love Song,Pt II"
"Nothing Else Matters"
"Wings”
"Salute"
"Down & Dirty"
"DNA" 
"Freak"
"Hair"
"Touch" 
”Reggaetón Lento (Remix)" 
Encore
"Shout Out to My Ex"
}}

{{hidden
| headercss = background: #ccccff; font-size: 100%; width: 90%;
| contentcss = text-align: left; font-size: 100%; width: 90%;
| header = Asia Leg
| content =
"Power"
"Black Magic"
"Move"
"No More Sad Songs"
"Secret Love Song, Pt II"
"Wings"
"Salute"
"DNA"
"Hair"
"Touch" / "Reggaetón Lento (Remix)"
"Shout Out to My Ex"
}}

Notes
 At the June 5th show in Copenhagen, "Nobody Like You" was cut from the setlist.

Tour dates

References

Citations

Notes 

2017 concert tours
Concert tours of the United Kingdom
Concert tours of Australia
Concert tours of Europe
Little Mix concert tours